Tristichotrochus tosaensis is a species of sea snail, a marine gastropod mollusk, in the family Calliostomatidae within the superfamily Trochoidea, the top snails, turban snails and their allies.

Description
The length of the shell attains 22 mm.

Distribution
This marine species occurs in Tosa Bay, Japan and in the East China Sea.

References

 Habe T. (1961). Coloured illustrations of the shells of Japan (II). Hoikusha, Osaka. xii + 183 + 42 pp., 66 pls.

Calliostomatidae
Gastropods described in 1961